The Premio Guido Berardelli is a Group 3 flat horse race in Italy open to two-year-old thoroughbreds. It is run at Capannelle over a distance of 1,800 metres (about 1⅛ miles), and it is scheduled to take place each year in late October or early November.

History
The event was formerly known as the Premio Tevere. It was named after the Tevere, the Italian name of the Tiber river.

The race was given its present title following the death of Guido Berardelli in 1985. Berardelli served as president of UNIRE, a governing body of horse racing in Italy.

For a period the race was contested over 1,600 metres and classed at Group 2 level. It was extended to 2,000 metres in 1988, and shortened to 1,800 metres in 1995. It was relegated to Group 3 status in 2002.

Records
Leading jockey since 1974 (5 wins):
 Gianfranco Dettori – Bolkonski (1974), Caro Bambino (1977), Panjandrum (1980), Miss Gris (1984), Yellow King (1988)

Leading trainer since 1982 (6 wins):
 Stefano Botti – Duck Feet (2011), Never Say Never (2012), Gentleman Only (2013), Misterious Boy (2014), Poeta Diletto (2015),Aethos (2016)

Winners since 1987

 Bernard finished first in 2004, but he was relegated to third place following a stewards' inquiry.

 The 2008 running was cancelled because of a strike.

 Gentleman Only was exported to Hong Kong and renamed Beauty Only.

 Wiesenbach was exported to Hong Kong and renamed Arcatraz.

 Bell'Imbusto finished first in 2020, but he was relegated to third place following a stewards' inquiry.

Earlier winners
<div style="font-size:90%; width:33%; float:left">
 1972: Isidoro di Carace
 1973: Little Boy Blue
 1974: Bolkonski
 1975: Bynoderm
 1976: Baudelaire
 1977: Caro Bambino
 1978: Ice Cool
 1979: Mister Ski
 1980: Panjandrum
 1981: Maria Stuarda
 1982: Hasty Flirt
 1983: Bob Back
 1984: Miss Gris
 1985: Bestebreuje
 1986: Melbury Lad

See also
 List of Italian flat horse races

References

 Racing Post:
 capannelleippodromo.it – Albo d'Oro – Premio Guido Berardelli.
 galopp-sieger.de – Premio Guido Berardelli (ex Premio Tevere).
 horseracingintfed.com – International Federation of Horseracing Authorities – Premio Guido Berardelli (2016).
 pedigreequery.com – Premio Guido Berardelli – Roma Capannelle.

Flat horse races for two-year-olds
Horse races in Italy
Sports competitions in Rome